The Pannonian Limes is that part of the old Roman fortified frontier known as the Danubian Limes that runs for approximately  from the Roman camp of Klosterneuburg in the Vienna Basin in Austria to the castrum in Singidunum (Belgrade)  in present-day Serbia. The garrisons of these camps protected the Pannonian provinces against attacks from the north from the time of Augustus (31 BC–14 AD) to the beginning of the 5th century. In places this section of the Roman limes also crossed the river into the territory of the barbarians (Barbaricum).

Geography

During the Roman Empire, the Pannonian region was divided into Pannonia Superior, or Upper Pannonia, to the west and Pannonia Inferior or Lower Pannonia to the east. Pannonia Superior consists mainly of present-day states of Austria, Croatia, Hungary, Slovakia, and Slovenia, while Pannonia Inferior consists of present-day states of Hungary, Croatia, Serbia, and Bosnia and Herzegovina.

History
The Danubian limes was one of the most turbulent regions in the European part of the Roman Empire and, during more than 400 years of Roman rule, Pannonia was one of its most important provinces, especially after the abandonment of Dacia Traiana in 271 AD, because from that point on, the pressure of migrating peoples on this section of the limes increased still further. The limes also had a great influence on the economic and cultural life of the civilian population because its hinterland was one of the main supply areas for the border troops and these in turn were the guarantors of the rapid Romanisation of the province.

The majority of the occupying forces were stationed in camps (castra), small forts (castella), watchtowers, burgi and fortified bridgeheads that were built at regular intervals along the riverbank. In an emergency, these units were reinforced by the legions which had their headquarters in four major military garrison towns. With its advance to the Danube, the Roman Empire became engaged in a long series of conflicts with trans-Danubian Germanic and Sarmatian barbarian and migrant peoples, that finally ended in the 5th century with the collapse of the Empire in the west.

See also 
 Pannonia
 Borders of the Roman Empire

References

Literature 
 Jenő Fitz (ed.): Der Römische Limes in Ungarn. Fejér Megyei Múzeumok Igazgatósága, 1976.
 Kurt Genser: Der österreichische Donaulimes in der Römerzeit. Ein Forschungsbericht. Verlag der Österreichischen Akademie der Wissenschaften, Vienna, 1986,  (Der römische Limes in Österreich 33).
 Kurt Genser: Der österreichische Limes in der Römerzeit. Ein Forschungsbericht (dissertation) Salzburg 1982, Teil II.
 Manfred Kandler, Hermann Vetters (ed.): Der römische Limes in Österreich, Vienna, 1989.
 Sándor Soproni: Die letzten Jahrzehnte des pannonischen Limes. Becksche Verlagsbuchhandlung, Munich, 1985, .
 Sándor Soproni: Der spätrömische Limes zwischen Esztergom und Szentendre. Akademiai Kiado, Budapest, 1978, .
 
 Sándor Soproni: Militär und Befestigungen am Pannonischen Limes, ed. Amt der NÖ Landesregierung, Abt. III/2, Catalogue of the Lower Austrian State Museum, New Issue No. 55, Die Römer an der Donau, Noricum und Pannonien, Vienna, 1973, pp 59–68.
Endre Tóth: Die spätrömische Militärarchitektur in Transdanubien. In Archaeologiai Értesitő. 134, Budapest 2009.
 Zsolt Visy (ed.): The Roman Army in Pannonia. An Archaeological Guide of the Ripa Pannonica. Teleki László Foundation, Budapest, 2003. .
 Zsolt Visy: The ripa Pannonica in Hungary. Akadémiai Kiadó, Budapest, 2003, .
 Zsolt Visy, Endre Tóth, Dénes Gabler, Lazlo Kocsis, Peter Kovacs, Zsolt Mráv, Mihaly Nagy u. a.: Von Augustus bis Attila – Leben am ungarischen Donaulimes. Konrad Theiss Verlag, Stuttgart, 2000,  (Schriften des Limesmuseums Aalen 53).
 Zsolt Visy: Der pannonische Limes in Ungarn. Konrad Theiss Verlag, Stuttgart, 1988, .
 Herma Stiglitz: Militär und Befestigungen am Österreichischen Limes, ed. Office of the Lower Austrian State Government, Dept. III/2, Catalogue of the Lower Austrian State Museum, New Series No. 55, Die Römer an der Donau, Noricum und Pannonien, Vienna, 1973, pp. 45–59.
 Frantisek Krizek: Die römischen Stationen im Vorland des norisch-pannonischen Limes bis zu den Markomannenkriegen. In: Studien zu den Militärgrenzen Roms. Vorträge des 6. Internationalen Limeskongresses in Süddeutschland. Böhlau Verlag, Cologne/Graz, 1967, pp. 131–137.
 Miroslava Mirkovic: Orbis Provinciarum, Moesia Superior, Eine Provinz an der Mittleren Donau, Zaberns Bildbände zur Archäologie, Sonderbände der Antiken Welt, Verlag Philipp v. Zabern, Mainz, 2007, .
 Orsolya Heinrich-Tamáska: Überlegungen zu den Hauptgebäuden der pannonischen Innenbefestigungen im Kontext spätrömischer Villenarchitektur, pp. 233 - 242, in: Gerda v. Bülow und Heinrich Zahbelicky: (edb.) Bruckneudorf und Gamzigrad. Spätantike Paläste und Großvillen im Donau-Balkan.Raum, Files of the International Colloquium in Bruckneudorf from 15 to 18 October 2008, Dr. Rudolf Habelt GmbH, Bonn, 2011. .

External links 
 Monuments Board of the Slovak Republic (ed.): Danube Limes in Slovakia. Ancient Roman Monuments on the Middle Danube. Printed Final Document to nominate the Slovakian Limes as a UNESCO World Heritage Site. Bratislava, 2011, pdf 5.76 MB, retrieved 4 May 2013
 Zsolt Máté et al.: Frontiers of the Roman Empire. Ripa Pannonica in Hungary (RPH). Nomination statement Vol. 1. National Office of Cultural Heritage, Budapest, 2011, pdf 3.07 MB, retrieved 4 May 2013
 Zsolt Máté et al.: Frontiers of the Roman Empire. Ripa Pannonica in Hungary (RPH). Nomination statement Vol. 2. Maps and plans, showing the boundaries of the nominated property and the buffer zone. National Office of Cultural Heritage, Budapest, 2011, pdf 119 MB, retrieved 4 May 2013
 Zsolt Visy: The Danube Limes Project Archaeological Research Between 2008–2011. University of Pécs, Department of Archaeology, Pécs, 2011, pdf 24 MB, retrieved 4 May 2013

Carnuntum:
 Archäologischer Park Carnuntum

Aquincum:
 Artist’s impression of the Late Anquity East Gate of the LL
 Artist’s impression of the civilian town
 Artist’s impression of a residence
 Remains of the amphitheatre

Binnenkastelle:
 Descriptions of the BK with illustrations (Hungarian)
 Artist’s impression of the Fenekpuszta camp

Roman fortifications in Pannonia Superior
Roman fortifications in Pannonia Inferior
Roman sites in Austria
Roman sites in Hungary
Roman sites in Slovakia
Archaeological sites in Austria
Archaeological sites in Hungary
Archaeological sites in Slovakia
Ruins in Austria
Ruins in Hungary
Ruins in Slovakia
Roman sites in Croatia
Roman sites in Serbia
Buildings and structures completed in the 1st century
Roman fortifications in Austria
Roman fortifications in Croatia
Roman fortifications in Hungary
Roman fortifications in Serbia
Roman fortifications in Slovakia
Roman frontiers